The 2020 Football Championship of Chernihiv Oblast is the 73rd season of the competition.

First stage

Northern Zone

Southern Zone

Second stage
In the second stage teams played the three from opposite zone only home and away, while results of teams from their home zone was grandfathered from the first stage.

Vyshcha Liha

Persha Liha

External links

Football
Chernihiv
Chernihiv